Sniffles may refer to:

 Sniffle, the instinctive action of inhaling quickly
 Common cold, also called "The Sniffles"
 Sniffles (Merrie Melodies), a Warner Bros. theatrical cartoon character
 Sniffles (Happy Tree Friends), a cartoon character